The Monticello Convention refers to a set of two separate meetings held in 1851 and 1852 to petition Congress to split the Oregon Territory into two separate territories; one north of the Columbia River and one south.

Background

The influx of people settling on the north side of the Columbia River in the 1840s, then under the jurisdiction of the Oregon Territory, caused political conflicts over the lack of basic needs addressed by the territorial government. Several major issues and events were the main causes to this dissatisfaction including that basic needs, such as mail, roads, military protection and law enforcement were increasingly required. The Oregon Territory government would not increase spending to satisfy these needs. Another was complaints against the Hudson’s Bay Company who still held the most valuable agricultural land and their livestock would trespass on settlers lands. Settlements north of the Columbia River were increasingly being cut off as the government services, Oregon City, Oregon and Salem, Oregon, required traveling for several days.

On July 4, 1851, complaints were brought by citizens to Olympia which were holding Independence Day celebrations.  One settler, Hugh Goldsborough read the Declaration of Independence and a fiery lawyer, John Chapman, gave an inspiration address referred to as the future state of Columbia. Chapman’s speech instigated an election of delegates to attend a convention at Cowlitz Landing, near present-day Toledo, Lewis County to be held the following month.

Cowlitz Convention
The first meeting of settlers began on August 29, 1851 at Cowlitz Landing. They met to draft a petition to Congress to create a new territory north of the Columbia River. Seth Catlin, a former Illinois legislator was elected president of the convention. Taking two days, documents were prepared explaining their demands from Congress and why they needed Congress’ support. The document was a 1,500-word “Memorial to Congress” listing the problems and issues facing those living north of the Columbia River. 
Territory and county borders were also approved as well as other elements of local governing. These documents were published in The Oregonian and the Oregon Spectator, which eventually made their way to Joseph Lane, Governor of the Oregon Territory.  The delegates were far ahead of their time in what they proposed. They recommended universal manhood suffrage beginning at the age of 18, which came about 120 year later.

Monticello Convention
The second meeting, for which the convention and petition takes its name, took place in the town of Monticello, later destroyed by flooding in 1867 and currently within present-day Longview, Cowlitz County.  Still feeling ignored by the Oregon Territory government, 44 delegates met on November 25, 1852 to develop, complete and sign another petition to have Columbia Territory established. Although this Memorial was a shorter than the earlier Cowlitz Memorial, it was better written and quickly adopted.  After signing the petition, it was again forwarded on to Joseph Lane, who supported the petition and had it sent on to Congress.

Notable Signees:
William Nathaniel Bell
Peter Crawford 
Arthur A. Denny
Calvin Henry Hale
Doc Maynard

Outcome
Bill H.R. 348, “to establish the territorial government of Columbia,” was introduced in the House of Representatives from the Committee on Territories. It was introduced by Charles E. Stuart on January 25, 1853. Debates arose, not about whether the bill would pass, but on the name of the new territory. Richard H. Stanton, a representative from Kentucky, proposed the name Washington after George Washington to avoid confusion with the District of Columbia.  The title of the bill was changed to “an act to establish the Territorial government of Washington” in the House and passed on February 10, 1853. It then passed the Senate on March 2, 1853 without any need for discussion.  After 21 months of campaigning, the bill was signed by President Millard Fillmore on March 2, 1853. The bill became known as the Organic Act and also served as the basis for law in Washington until it gained statehood in 1889.

References 

 
History of Oregon
 
 
 
 
History of the Northwestern United States
Pre-statehood history of Washington (state)
1851 conferences
1852 conferences